IBSA may stand for:

 India-Brazil-South Africa Dialogue Forum, commonly known as IBSA, a three-country alignment
 IBSA Group, a pharmaceutical Company headquartered in Switzerland
 International Bible Students Association, a corporate not-for-profit organization used by Jehovah's Witnesses in the U.K.
 International Blind Sports Federation, the governing body for blind sports
 Interstate Batteries, a private company in the U.S.